Spinomantis tavaratra is a species of frogs in the mantellid subfamily Mantellinae. It is endemic to the humid forests of northwestern Madagascar.

Taxonomy
This species was described in the genus Spinomantis by Cramer, Rabibisoa, and Raxworthy in 2008. The species is named tavaratra is a Malagasy word for "the north", referencing the provenance of this species in northern Madagascar.

Description
Adult males measure  in snout–vent length (SVL); females measure . The species is also characterised by simple dermal spines of less than  length on the posterior margin of the tarsus.

Habitat and ecology
It is an arboreal species that breeds in streams.

References

tavaratra
Endemic frogs of Madagascar
Amphibians described in 2008